Walter Ulysses Johnson (born November 13, 1963) is a former American football linebacker in the National Football League for the Houston Oilers and New Orleans Saints. He played college football at Louisiana Tech University.

Early years
Johnson attended Ferriday High School, where he was a defensive end. He also practiced basketball and track. He accepted a football scholarship from Louisiana Tech University. 

As a sophomore in 1984, he registered 76 tackles, 11 sacks and 2 blocked kicks. He contributed to the team winning the Southland Conference and reaching the Division I-AA National championship game, where they lost 6-19 against Montana State University.

He blocked 4 kicks as a junior. He was moved from defensive end to outside linebacker as a senior.

He started every game of his college career, finishing with 327 tackles, 38 sacks (school record), 23 pass break ups, 12 forced fumbles and 6 fumble recoveries.

In 2013, he was inducted into the Louisiana Tech University Athletic Hall of Fame. He also was named to the Louisiana Tech All-Century football team.

Professional career
Johnson was selected by the Houston Oilers in the second round (46th overal) of the 1987 NFL Draft. He was a backup at outside linebacker and special teams player for 2 seasons.

In 1989, he was signed as a Plan B free agent by the New Orleans Saints. He was a backup at outside linebacker behind Pat Swilling. He had 3 tackles and one blocked extra point.

In 1990, he signed as a Plan B free agent with the Dallas Cowboys, with the intention of playing him at defensive end. He was released on August 26.

In 1991, he signed as a free agent with the New Orleans Saints. He was released on August 26.

Personal life
Johnson volunteers as an assistant football coach at Ferriday High School. He owns a convenience store.

References

External links
 Walter Johnson Stats

1963 births
Living people
American football linebackers
Houston Oilers players
Louisiana Tech Bulldogs football players
New Orleans Saints players
High school football coaches in Louisiana
Sportspeople from Monroe, Louisiana
Players of American football from Louisiana